Ostrovicë or Mali i Ostrovicës is a mountain range located in the south-eastern part of Albania. The ridge of Ostrovicë is covered in grasslands and at the summits the ridge gets very rocky.

Location

Ostrovicë's location is in south-eastern Albania, between the rivers Osum and Devoll which are confluences of the Seman river which enters the Adriatic north of the city of Vlorë. The region around the mountain is very remote containing many canyons and gorges and other mountain peaks such as Tomorr . The largest settlement found near Ostrovicë is Çorovodë to its west.

References

Mountains of Albania 
Ridges of Europe